Spidia excentrica is a moth in the family Drepanidae. It was described by Strand in 1912. It is found in Cameroon.

References

Moths described in 1912
Drepaninae